János Kertész is a Hungarian physicist. He is one of the pioneers of econophysics, complex networks and application of fractal geometry in physical problems.

He is the director of the Institute of Physics in Budapest University of Technology and Economics, Budapest, Hungary.

References

External links

 Personal Homepage

21st-century Hungarian physicists
Living people
Year of birth missing (living people)